The Roman Catholic Diocese of Oeiras is a Latin suffragan diocese in the Ecclesiastical province of Teresina in northeastern Brazil.

Its cathedral episcopal see is Catedral Nossa Senhora da Vitória, dedicated to Our Lady of Victory, in the city of Oeiras in the Brazilian state of Piauí.

Statistics 
As per 2014, it pastorally served 125,000 Catholics (89.2% of 140,200 total) on 15,096 km² in 20 parishes with 20 priests (19 diocesan, 1 religious), 17 lay religious (1 brother, 16 sisters) and 6 seminarians.

History 
 Established on 16 December 1944 as Diocese of Oeiras, on territory split off from the Diocese of Piaui
 Lost territory on 1974.10.28 to establish the Diocese of Picos
 Renamed on 8 December 1977 as Diocese of Oeiras–Floriano
 Renamed back 27 February 2008 as Diocese of Oeiras, having gained territory from its Metropolitan Archdiocese of Teresina and from Diocese of São Raimundo Nonato, but having lost territory to establish the Diocese of Floriano, to which see the incumbent transferred

Bishops
(all Roman Rite)

Episcopal ordinaries
Suffragan Bishops of Oeiras (first time)
 Francisco Expedito Lopes (1948.08.30 – 1954.08.24), next Bishop of Garanhuns (Brazil) (1954.08.24 – death 1957.07.01)
 Raimundo de Castro e Silva (1954.11.17 – 1957.11.09), previously Titular Bishop of Eluza (1950.06.17 – 1954.11.17) as Auxiliary Bishop of Teresina (Brazil) (1950.06.17 – 1954.11.17); later Titular Bishop of Uzalis (1957.11.09 – 1991.08.02) as Auxiliary Bishop of Fortaleza (Brazil) (1957.11.09 – 1991.08.02)
 Edilberto Dinkelborg, Friars Minor (O.F.M.) (born Germany) (1959.06.20 – 1977.12.08 see below)

Suffragan  Bishops of Oeiras – Floriano
 Edilberto Dinkelborg, O.F.M. (see above 1977.12.08 – death 1991.12.31)
 Fernando Panico, Sacred Heart Missionaries (M.S.C.) (born Italy) (1993.06.02 – 2001.05.02), next Bishop of Crato (Brazil) (2001.05.02 – retired 2016.12.28)
 Augusto Alves da Rocha (2001.10.24 – 2008.02.27); previously Bishop of Picos (Brazil) (1975.05.23 – 2001.10.24); later Bishop of daughter see Floriano (Brazil) (2008.02.27 – 2010.03.17)

Suffragan Bishops of Oeiras (second time)
 Juarez Sousa Da Silva (2008.02.27 – 6 January 2016), next Coadjutor Bishop of Parnaíba (Brazil) (2016.01.06 – 2016.08.24), succeeding as Bishop of Parnaíba (2016.08.24 – ...)
 Edilson Soares Nobre (11 January 2017 - ...)

Other priest of this diocese who became bishop
Pedro Brito Guimarães, appointed Bishop of São Raimundo Nonato, Piaui in 2002

See also 
 List of Catholic dioceses in Brazil

References

Sources and external links 
 GCatholic.org, with Google map & - satellite photo - data for all sections
 Catholic Hierarchy

Roman Catholic dioceses in Brazil
Christian organizations established in 1944
Roman Catholic Ecclesiastical Province of Teresina
Roman Catholic dioceses and prelatures established in the 20th century